Sanchajie Station is a metro station of Line 1 of the Fuzhou Metro. It is located at the intersection of Shangsan Road, South Liuyi Road and Zexu Avenue in Cangshan District, Fuzhou, Fujian, China. It started operation on May 18, 2016. Sanchajie Station was once the terminus of this line until the opening of northern section on 6 January 2017.

References 

Railway stations in China opened in 2016
Fuzhou Metro stations